is a professional Japanese baseball player. He plays pitcher for the Saitama Seibu Lions.

References 

1996 births
Living people
Baseball people from Hyōgo Prefecture
Nippon Sport Science University alumni
Japanese baseball players
Nippon Professional Baseball pitchers
Saitama Seibu Lions players